Practical Farmers of Iowa (also known as PFI or Practical Farmers) is a non-profit farmer organization supporting agricultural producers in Iowa, and around the central United States. 
PFI's mission is to advance profitable, ecologically sound, and community-enhancing approaches to agriculture through farmer-led investigation and information sharing.

Practical Farmers of Iowa is a 501(c)(3) nonprofit charitable organization. For fiscal year 2012, Practical Farmers had an operating budget of approximately $1.1 million.

History 
Practical Farmers of Iowa was founded in 1985 by Richard Thompson, Larry Kallem, Rick Exner, and Rick Voland.

References

External links
 https://practicalfarmers.org

Agricultural organizations based in the United States
Agricultural education
Agriculture in Iowa
Sustainability
1985 establishments in Iowa